Cotopaxi is a volcano in Ecuador.

Cotopaxi may also refer to:

Cotopaxi (painting), by Frederic Edwin Church
"Cotopaxi" (song), by The Mars Volta
Cotopaxi, Colorado, United States
Cotopaxi Province, Ecuador
SS Cotopaxi, an American tramp steamer

Cotopaxi, Cotopaxi Cruiser, and Cotopaxi Steamer, earlier names of BAE Abdón Calderón, a naval ship of Ecuador